Stricken may refer to:

 "Stricken" (song), a 2005 song by Disturbed
 Stricken (2010 film), a 2010 American film directed by Matthew Sconce
 Stricken (2009 film), a 2009 Dutch drama film
 "Stricken", when a warship's name is removed from a country's Navy List